Tichkaella is a genus of helcionellid from the Middle Cambrian.  It has a strongly spiralled, smooth shell with  concentric ridges that have low relief. Other than its looser coiling, it is very similar to Protowenella.

References

Cambrian molluscs
Paleozoic life of British Columbia
Fossils of Morocco